Judith McCoy Miller (born 1944) is an author of Christian fiction.

Biography
Miller is a certified legal assistant currently employed as a public service administrator in the Legal Section of the Department of Administration for the State of Kansas.

She was born in Pittsburgh, Pennsylvania and grew up in that area.  She now lives in Topeka, Kansas with her husband Jim.  They had four children: Steve, Michelle, Justin, and Jenna.  Michelle died in 1996.

List of works by Judith Miller

Bells of Lowell series
written with Tracie Peterson, published by Bethany House: "Bringing the late 19th-century mill town of Lowell, Massachusetts, to life in a fascinating slice of history."

 Daughter of the Loom, 2003
 A Fragile Design, 2003
 These Tangled Threads, 2003

Lights of Lowell series
written with Tracie Peterson, published by Bethany House: "Courage, faith, and love are at the heart of this moving saga of a young woman’s stand for what she knows is right."

 A Tapastry of Hope, 2004
 A Love Woven True, 2005
 The Pattern of her Heart, 2005

Freedom's Path series
published by Bethany House: "Lured by the promise of true freedom, a thriving community, and land to call their own, sharecroppers Ezekiel Harban and his three daughters set off for Nicodemus, Kansas. When their wagon train arrives, they are shocked at what they find, and many give up and head back home."

 First Dawn, 2005
 Morning Sky, 2006
 Daylight Comes, 2006

Postcards from Pullman series
published by Bethany House: "Inspired by the fascinating history of the company town of Pullman, Illinois, where the elegant Pullman Palace sleeper cars were manufactured in the 1880s and 90s, Postcards From Pullman tells the three-part story of Olivia Mott, an English immigrant who becomes a chef in Pullman's famed Hotel Florence."

 In the Company of Secrets, 2007
 Whisper Along the Rails, 2007
 An Uncertain Dream, 2008

Broadmoor Legacy series
written with Tracie Peterson, published by Bethany House: "a heart-stirring series featuring three young women searching for love and a legacy the 1890s."

 A Daughter's Inheritance, 2008
 An Unexpected Love, 2008
 A Surrendered Heart, coming summer 2009

Bridal Veil Island Series
written with Tracie Peterson, published by Bethany House

 To Have and to Hold, 2011
 To Love and Cherish, 2012
 To Honor and Trust, 2013

Home to Amana Series
published by Bethany House

  A Hidden Truth, 2012

Standalone Books
 Spring's Memory, novella with the other authors Colleen Coble, Carol Cox, and Darlene Mindrup, published by Barbour Publishing, 1999.
 The Journey of Jung Lee, published by David C Cook, 2000
 American Dream, novella with the other authors Kristy Dykes, Nancy J. Farrier, and Sally Laity, published by Barbour Publishing, 2000
 The Storyteller's Collection: Tales from Home, book 2, a collection of short stories by various authors, published by Multnomah Publishers
 Kansas, with Tracie Peterson and published by Barbour Publishing, 2001
 China Tapastry, novella with the other authors Tracey Victoria Bateman, Susan Downs, and Jennifer Peterson, 2002
 The Carousel Painter, published Bethany House, September 2009
 Prairie Romance Collection, Barbour, 2012
 A Patchwork Christmas Collection, Barbour, 2012
 Immigrant Brides Collection, Barbour, 2013

Heartsong Presents books
These are standalone Christian Romance novels from the Heartsong Presents company, which sends out regular mailings of books to members.

 Threads of Love (Heartsong 223) reprinted in Kansas novella
 Woven Threads (Heartsong 244)
 A Trusting Heart (Heartsong 286)
 Changes of the Heart (Heartsong 300)
 Sleigh Bells (Heartsong 407)

External links

Christian writers
21st-century American novelists
American women novelists
American historical novelists
1944 births
Living people
21st-century American women writers
Women historical novelists